Nepenthes armin is a tropical pitcher plant native to the Philippines. The type specimen was collected in 1989 on Sibuyan Island, at an elevation of 750 m above sea level. The specific epithet armin honours Armin Rios Marin.

References

armin
Endemic flora of the Philippines
Carnivorous plants of Asia
Plants described in 2014
Taxa named by Martin Cheek
Taxa named by Matthew Jebb